Erectus, a Latin word meaning erect, may refer to :

taxonomy
 Homo erectus, an extinct species of hominin
 Bryanthus × erectus, a species of ornamental plant of family Ericaceae now placed in the genus × Phyllothamnus
 a rosemary cultivar

popular culture
 Cultösaurus Erectus, a 1980 album by Blue Öyster Cult
 Dennis Erectus, a personality on  San Jose, California's radio KOME
 Nippleus Erectus, a drummer of GWAR
 Pithecanthropus Erectus (album), a 1956 album by jazz composer and bassist Charles Mingus
 Rattus Erectus 1976-1982, a Mickey Ratt compilation

See also
 Including use as a species name
List of Latin and Greek words commonly used in systematic names
 Erecta
 Erectum (disambiguation)
 H. erectus (disambiguation)
 Homo erectus (disambiguation)